Brietzke is a German surname. Notable people with the surname include:

Irene Brietzke (1944–2021), Brazilian actress and theatre director
Jürgen Brietzke (born 1959), German sailor
 Siegfried Brietzke (born 1952), German rower

German-language surnames